Arthur David Mitchell (born 5 February 1943) is a British retired slalom canoeist who competed in the 1960s and the 1970s. He won two medals at the ICF Canoe Slalom World Championships, with a silver in 1967 (K-1) and a bronze in 1963 Spittal (Folding K-1 team).

Mitchell also finished 22nd in the K-1 event at the 1972 Summer Olympics in Munich.

Mitchell holds the record for the most consecutive British National Titles with 6, and has a total of 8.

After retiring from racing in 1975 Mitchell coached the United States from 1977 to 1992. In 1967 Mitchell began his course designing career that he continued through 2000, with his last course being the Sydney Olympic course. He designed the course for the 1996 and 2000 Olympics and many World Championships. 

Mitchell also has an extensive collection of wild water medals.

References

Sports-reference.com profile

British male canoeists
1943 births
Canoeists at the 1972 Summer Olympics
Living people
Olympic canoeists of Great Britain
Medalists at the ICF Canoe Slalom World Championships